Montañita is a small coastal town in Ecuador located in the parish of Manglaralto, province of Santa Elena, about 180 kilometers northwest of Guayaquil. Its name means "small mountain." In the mid 20th century it was known as a surfing beach, with only a few fishermen's huts, and one or two surfers tents in summer, erected at the site. But in 1960, Montañita, foreigners linked to the hippie movement decided to settle there permanently. It is now a popular destination for surfers from around the world and considered one of the best surfing beaches in Ecuador's south coast.

Characteristics

The town of Montañita is laid out in a grid of small streets crowded with shops and restaurants. Most of the east/west roads have beach access. The town has  four main areas: the beach, the Point, Trigrillo neighborhood and the Center. The Point is the small mountain, that separates Montañita's beach from that of the neighboring town of Olon. The first cement beach house in the town, constructed by two foreigners Jack and James who had formerly been camping on the beach, is a notable feature of the town. {{Citation needed|date=June 2022}}

Climate
Montañita's climate is that of a tropical, coastal city. Its average temperature is 28°C (82°F), and the rainy season runs from December to May. However, rainfall is low and typically occurs in the evening or night. Water temperatures range from 13-20°C (56-68°F).

Economy
 Montañita's economy is dependent on tourism, especially food service, surfing, and craft sales. Besides surfing, tourists and locals come to engage in bodyboarding, scuba diving, and windsurfing. The tourist season peaks in January and hits its low in June. Each February, Carnival is held in Montañita.

Surfing in Montañita
Surfing in Montañita offers strong, consistent waves and good tubes make it a great place for accomplished surfers and challenging for newer surfers. Montañita is an increasingly popular destination on the international surfing circuit. In the summer months wave heights range from 0.3 to 1 meter. In the late fall and winter waves can be as large as 1.5 meters. Between January and March, waves may be large as 2 meters. Montañita hosts an international surfing competition each February during Carnival.

Curiosities
The main means of transportation are bicycles, pedicabs and the occasional truck, although the streets are mostly pedestrian. It is common to hear reggae music on street corners, and banners of peace symbols, or the portrait of Che Guevara, John Lennon or Bob Marley are common. Montañita has bars, restaurants, and cafés that cater to international tastes. During peak tourists season, there are many electronic/house music festivals on the beach. There are three schools that specialize in teaching Spanish. Montañita Spanish School was the first professional Spanish language school in town.

On December 5, 2014 the movie "Sexy Montañita", directed by Alberto Pablo Rivera, was released.

Montañita is widely known for its legal cannabis use due to an Ecuadorian law according to which individuals are allowed to carry a small "personal" amount of marijuana.

References

External links

Montañita 2012 Montañita Ecuador Guide 2012
Montañita Ecuador Area Road Map

Populated places in Santa Elena Province
Beaches of Ecuador
Surfing locations in Ecuador